Miracolo italiano (also known as An Italian Miracle) is a 1994 Italian anthology comedy film directed by Enrico Oldoini.

Cast 
 Renato Pozzetto: Fermo Pulciani/ Passenger of the Ferry 
 Nino Frassica: Toti/ Ernesto
 Ezio Greggio: Manuel Rodriguez/ Marcello Troiani
 Giorgio Faletti: Teodoro Pautasso, aka Teo
 Maria Amelia Monti: Lucia Baggioni
 Leonardo Pieraccioni: Saverio
 Anna Falchi: Maria
 Nadia Rinaldi: Adelaide
 Claudia Koll: Maria Carla
 Daniela Conti: Rosalia
 Athina Cenci: Teo's mother-in-law/ Saverio's mother 
 Carlo Monni: Nedo
 Novello Novelli: Grandfather of Saverio
 Sergio Bini Bustric:  Brother of Saverio
 Tony Sperandeo: Deputy Locafò
 Gianfranco Barra: Deputy Nania
 Cecilia Dazzi: Vanessa
 Carlotta Natoli: Samantha 
 Dario Bandiera: the Taxi Driver
 Enrico Brignano: Michele 
 Remo Remotti: Fermo's father
 Francesco Benigno: Carmelo

References

External links

1994 films
Italian comedy films
1994 comedy films
Films directed by Enrico Oldoini
1990s Italian films